Melville Island may refer to:
 Melville Island (Australia), in the Northern Territory
 Melville Island (Northwest Territories and Nunavut), in northern Canada
 Melville Island (Nova Scotia), a small island in Halifax Harbour, Nova Scotia, Canada
 Melville Island, a small island in the Discovery Islands near Campbell River, British Columbia, Canada
 Melville Island, a small island near Dundas Island near Prince Rupert, British Columbia, Canada